Culciu is a commune of 3,751 inhabitants situated in Satu Mare County, Romania. Its center is Culciu Mare, and the commune is composed of six villages:

References

Communes in Satu Mare County